The 1902 Drake Bulldogs football team was an American football team that represented Drake University as an independent during the 1902 college football season. In its first and only season under head coach G. O. Dietz, the team compiled a 5–2–1 record and outscored opponents by a total of 127 to 23. Left end "Squatty" Bates was the team captain.

Schedule

References

Drake
Drake Bulldogs football seasons
Drake Bulldogs football